Divrash (also Romanized as Dīvrash) is a village in Rahmatabad Rural District, Rahmatabad and Blukat District, Rudbar County, Gilan Province, Iran. At the 2006 census, its population was 262, in 69 families.

References 

Populated places in Rudbar County